is a Japanese actor and voice actor from Sakata, Yamagata, Japan.

Biography

Filmography

Anime

Feature films

Video games

Overseas dubbing

Live-action

Animation

Tokusatsu

Notes

References

External links
 Official agency profile 
 

1956 births
Living people
Japanese male stage actors
Japanese male video game actors
Japanese male voice actors
Male voice actors from Yamagata Prefecture
Actors from Yamagata Prefecture
Toyo University alumni